John Lovett (February 20, 1761 in Newent Society, New London County, Connecticut – August 12, 1818 in Fort Meigs, Wood County, Ohio) was an American politician from New York.

Life
Lovett graduated from Yale College in 1782. He moved to Albany, New York, and thence to Fort Miller, where he was employed as general agent and land steward. Then he moved to Lansingburgh. He was member from Rensselaer County of the New York State Assembly in 1800-01.

Afterwards he returned to Albany and was Clerk of the Common Council until the outbreak of the War of 1812 during which he was military secretary to Gen. Stephen Van Rensselaer IV. Lovett was wounded at the Battle of Queenston in October 1812, and returned to Albany. He was Clerk of Albany County from 1813 to 1815.

Lovett was elected as a Federalist to the 13th and 14th United States Congresses, holding office from March 4, 1813, to March 3, 1817.

Afterwards he settled at Perrysburg, Ohio but died the next year.

Sources

The New York Civil List compiled by Franklin Benjamin Hough (pages 70, 174, 288 and 385; Weed, Parsons and Co., 1858)

1761 births
1818 deaths
Yale College alumni
Politicians from Albany, New York
People from Lansingburgh, New York
People from Lisbon, Connecticut
Members of the New York State Assembly
People from Wood County, Ohio
People from Fort Edward, New York
American military personnel of the War of 1812
Federalist Party members of the United States House of Representatives from New York (state)